Crecora is a village in County Limerick, Ireland, located approximately  from Limerick city.

The small village has a school, stone yard, garden centre, GAA pitch (of Crecora/Manister GAA), post office and a Roman Catholic church. This church, Saints Peter and Paul's church, was built in 1864 and is in the parish of Mungret, Crecora and Raheen within the Roman Catholic Diocese of Limerick.

See also
 List of towns and villages in Ireland

References

Towns and villages in County Limerick